Stochos (Greek: Στόχος, English: Target) is a nationalist Greek weekly newspaper, first published in 1985. It was founded by Georgios Kapsalis (d. 1999). Until the death of its founder, the newspaper was strictly national conservative, rejecting all political parties. The newspaper during its new era, has change some of its policies about all political parties rejection and sometimes is friendly with nationalist parties, like Golden Dawn political party, which has been described as ultra-nationalist, fascist, and neo-Nazi by groups like the Stephen Roth Institute for the Study of Contemporary Antisemitism and Racism.

http://www.tau.ac.il/Anti-Semitism/asw2003-4/greece.htm

Greek-language newspapers
Weekly newspapers published in Greece
Publications established in 1985
1985 establishments in Greece